Aulich is a surname. Notable people with the surname include:

 Lajos Aulich (1793–1849), Hungarian soldier
 Terry Aulich (born 1945), Australian politician